Charles R. Neale (11 February 1917 – 16 December 1977), known as Jack Neale, was an English footballer who represented Great Britain at the 1948 Summer Olympics. Neale played amateur football for Walton & Hersham.

In 1938 he appeared for the Civil Service team against the Royal Air Force; his work place was described as "Woking Post Office".

References

1917 births
1977 deaths
English footballers
Walton & Hersham F.C. players
Footballers at the 1948 Summer Olympics
Olympic footballers of Great Britain
Association footballers not categorized by position